Qolqol or Qol Qol may refer to:
 Qolqol, Hamadan